Andrea Polli (born 1968) is an environmental artist and writer. Polli blends art and science to create widely varied media and technology artworks related to environmental issues. Her works are presented in various forms, she uses interactive websites, digital broadcasting, mobile applications, and performances, which  allows her to reach a wider audience.

Her work has appeared widely in over one hundred exhibitions and performances both nationally and internationally including the Whitney Museum of American Art Artport and the Field Museum of Natural History. She has received numerous grants, residencies, including a residency at Eyebeam, and awards including the Fulbright Specialist Program (2011) and the UNESCO Digital Arts Award (2003). She is currently an Associate Professor of Art and Ecology at the University of New Mexico.

Education  
Polli has a Master of Fine Arts in time arts from the School of the Art Institute of Chicago. She has a PhD in computing, communications and electronics from the University of Plymouth, UK.

As an educator, Polli has developed new media programs at Robert Morris College and Columbia College in Chicago. She was voted 2000/2001 Teacher of the Year at Columbia in recognition of her work connecting students to the wider community through collaborative projects. 
From 2005 to 2008 she served as the director of the Integrated Media Arts Masters of Fine Arts Program at Hunter College in New York City. She later became an associate professor of Art and Ecology with appointments in the College of Fine Arts and School of Engineering at the University of New Mexico, where she directs the Social Media Workgroup, a lab at the University's Center for Advanced Research Computing.

Work

Sonification 
Polli works with atmospheric scientists to develop systems for understanding storm and climate through sound. She began collaborating with atmospheric scientists on sound and data sonification projects in 1999, and has worked with NASA's Goddard Institute Climate Research Group in New York City and the National Center for Atmospheric Research. Her New York installation Atmospherics/Weather Works was a spatialized sonification that used highly detailed models to recreate the sound of two historic east coast storms: the presidents’ Day Snowstorm of 1979 and Hurricane Bob in 1991. In 2007/2008 she spent seven weeks in Antarctica on a National Science Foundation funded project, collaborating with artist Tia Kramer, who was working as a communications operator at McMurdo Station, and other scientists. The sounds she recorded there included water pouring off a glacier and wind whipping through the valleys. Heat and the Heartbeat of the City is a series of sonifications of actual and projected climate in Central Park.  N. (pronounced n-point), created in collaboration with Joe Gilmore, is a real-time multi-channel sonification and visualization of weather in the Arctic.

Light installation 

Polli has also experimented with the visualization of air.  Particle Falls is a light installation that displayed air quality information in real time, using a nephelometer to sample particulate matter in air from a city street, and projecting changing light patterns every 15 seconds onto the wall of Philadelphia's Wilma Theater.

“Philadelphia has come a long way in improving the quality of the air we breathe, but our work isn't done. Particle Falls makes it possible to see—in real time and vivid color—the challenges we continue to face." Thomas Huynh, director, Air Management Services, City of Philadelphia.

Experimental architecture 
Polli's proposed Queensbridge Wind Power Project would incorporate wind turbines into a bridge's structure to recreate aspects of its original design as well as producing energy to light the bridge and neighboring areas.

Polli worked in collaboration with Rod Gdovic of WindStax, a Pittsburgh-based wind turbine manufacturer, on Energy Flow, an installation with 27,000 multicolored LED lights positioned along the Rachel Carson Bridge in Pittsburgh, PA. The vertical cables of the bridge show a real-time visualization of wind speed and direction captured by a weather station located on the bridge. The electricity that powers Energy Flow is generated by sixteen wind turbines attached to the catenary arches of the bridge. Energy Flow  uses data visualization to make people aware of changes in the environment.

References

1968 births
Living people
Environmental artists
American women in electronic music
School of the Art Institute of Chicago alumni
Alumni of the University of Plymouth
Robert Morris University Illinois faculty
Columbia College Chicago faculty
Hunter College faculty
University of New Mexico faculty
American women academics
21st-century American women